The Journal of Agrarian Change is a peer-reviewed academic journal established in 2001 covering agrarian political economy. The journal publishes historical and contemporary studies of the social relations and dynamics of production, power relations in agrarian formations and ownership structures and their processes of change.

The journal was founded by Henry Bernstein and Terry Byres, former editors of the Journal of Peasant Studies. In the introductory issue of the Journal of Agrarian Change Bernstein and Byres expressed a desire that the new journal would have more coverage of historical and comparative debates, feminist scholarship, analysis of migration and rural labor markets, social differentiation and class formation from a wider set of regions and agrarian formations.
Since 2001 the journal has covered debates such as: the farm-size and productivity debate; land reform; paths of capitalist transition; the politics of transnational agrarian social movements; the environmental contradictions of capitalist agriculture; global value chain analysis and commodity certification schemes; the agrarian roots of violence and conflict; and migration and rural labour markets.
 
Issues have covered rural labour and social movements and land reform in Latin America. The journal has also included special issues and symposia on Agrarian Transitions and Left Politics in India; Microfinance and Rural Development; The Political Economy and Ecology of Capture Fisheries; The Agrarian Roots of Violent Conflict; the Political Ecology of  Capitalist Agriculture and the 2007–8 World Food Crisis.

Abstracting and indexing 
The Journal of Agrarian Change is abstracted and indexed in: Academic Search Premier, AGRICOLA, CABDirect, CSA Biological Sciences Database, CSA Environmental Sciences & Pollution Management Database, Current Contents/Social & Behavioral Sciences, Ecology Abstracts, EMBiology, GEOBASE/Geographical & Geological Abstracts, ProQuest, Social Sciences Citation Index, SocINDEX, Sociological Abstracts, Soils and Fertilizer Abstracts, and Worldwide Political Sciences Abstracts. According to the Journal Citation Reports, the journal has a 2012 impact factor of 2.191 and ranks 6/55 in Planning & Development and 36/333 in Economics.

References

External links 
 

Publications established in 2001
English-language journals
Wiley-Blackwell academic journals
Agricultural journals
Development studies journals
Quarterly journals